This is a list of African-American activists covering various areas of activism, but primarily focus on those African Americans who historically and currently have been fighting racism and racial injustice against African Americans. The United States of America has a long history of racism against its Black citizens. The names detailed below contains only notable African Americans who are known to be activist (sorted by surname).

A

B

C

D

E

F

G

H

I

J

K

|Kanye West||Civil rights ||
|}

L

M

N

O

P

R

S

T

V

W

X

Y

References

 
Activists
African American activists